Ziebart is a German-language surname, a variant of Siebert

Ziebart may also refer to:
Ziebart International Corporation, USA
Kurt Ziebart, founder of Ziebart Corp.
Wolfgang Ziebart, German engineer and entrepreneur
Wolfgang Ziebart (karate), A German karateka of 1970s